Jacques Morel was a French writer, laureate of the Prix Femina in 1912.

This name is the pseudonym of the wife of archaeologist Edmond Pottier (1855–1934).

Works 
1901: Muets aveux, Hachette
1905: La Dette, Calmann-Lévy
1912: Feuilles mortes, Hachette, Prix Femina.
1927: Par un chemin détourné, Armand Colin
1930: L'Homme dangereux, Fayard

References 

20th-century French non-fiction writers
20th-century French women writers
Prix Femina winners